Najib or Najeeb is an Arabic male given name. Notable people with the name include:

Given name 
 Najib ad-Dawlah Yousafzai (died 1770), Pashtun warrior who fought in the Third Battle of Panipat
 Najib Amhali (born 1971), Moroccan-born Dutch stand-up comedian and actor
 Najib Ali Choudhury, Bengali Islamic scholar 
 Najib Balala (born 1967), Kenyan  politician
 Nayib Bukele (born 1981), President of El Salvador
 Najib Daho (1959–1993), Moroccan-born English boxer
 Najib-ul-Daula (died 1770), tribal chief in Rohilkhand, India
 Najib Farssane (born 1981), French footballer
 Najib Mikati (born 1955), Prime Minister of Lebanon
 Najib Mohammad Lahassimi (born 1978), Moroccan held in Guantanamo
 Najib Naderi (born 1984), Afghan footballer
 Najib Tun Razak (born 1953), sixth Prime Minister of Malaysia
 Najib-ad-din Samarqandi (died 1222), Persian physician

Middle name 
 Abu al-Najib al-Suhrawardi (1097–1168), Persian Sufi
 Ahmad Najib al-Hilali (1891–1958), Prime Minister of Egypt
 Ahmad Najib Aris, Malaysian convicted murderer and rapist
 Baraa Najib al-Ruba'i, Iraqi politician
 Muhammad Najib ar-Ruba'i (1904–1983), President of Iraq
 Philippe Najib Boulos (1902–1979), Lebanese lawyer and politician

Najeeb

Given name
 Najeeb Ahmed (died 1990), Pakistani student leader
 Najeeb Amar (born 1971, Pakistan-born Hong-Kong cricketer
 Nageeb Arbeely (1861–1904), American Consul to Jerusalem, founder of the newspaper Kawkab America
 Najeeb Jung, Indian academic administrator
 Najeeb Halaby (1915–2003), American businessman and government official
 Najeeb Qahtan Al-Sha'abi, Yemeni politician

See also
Naguib

Arabic masculine given names